The Doobie Brothers is the debut studio album by American rock band The Doobie Brothers. The album was released on April 30, 1971, by Warner Bros. Records. It is their only official studio album to feature original bass player Dave Shogren on all tracks, who left during the recording of their second album.

The first single from the album, "Nobody," failed to chart, as did the album itself.  The single was re-released in October 1974 with a slightly edited length of 3:27 after the group had become a highly successful touring and recording act, peaking at #58 on the Billboard Hot 100. "Nobody" was later re-recorded for the group's 2010 album, World Gone Crazy.

Track listing

Personnel
The Doobie Brothers
Tom Johnston – lead and backing vocals, acoustic and electric guitars, harmonica on "Greenwood Creek" and "Chicago", piano on "Growin' a Little Each Day" and "Closer Every Day"
Patrick Simmons – backing vocals, lead vocals on "Closer Every Day", co-lead vocals on "Beehive State", acoustic and electric guitars
Dave Shogren – backing vocals, bass guitar, organ on "Closer Every Day"
John Hartman – drums, tambourine on "Feelin' Down Farther"

Production
Producers: Ted Templeman, Lenny Waronker
Executive Producers: Marty Cohn, Paul Curcio
Engineer: Marty Cohn
Digital Mastering: Lee Herschberg
Mastering: Lee Herschberg
Photography: Jim Marshall
Art Direction: Ed Thrasher
Arrangers: Patrick Simmons, The Doobie Brothers

References

 

1971 debut albums
The Doobie Brothers albums
Albums produced by Ted Templeman
Albums produced by Lenny Waronker
Warner Records albums